The Dean of Lismore is based at The Cathedral Church of St Carthage, Lismore in the united  Diocese of Cashel and Ossory within the Church of Ireland.

The current incumbent is Paul Draper.

List of deans of Lismore

?–1549 James Butler 
1564 Gerald FitzJames FitzGerald (deprived) 
1583–1610 John Prendergast
1610-1614 Thomas Wilson
1614–1622 Michael Boyle (appointed Bishop of Waterford and Lismore 1619, but retained deanery in commendam until 1622) 
1622–1622 Edward Brouncker
1622–1627/8 Robert Daborne
1628 John Greg 
1630–1639/40 Robert Naylor (afterwards Dean of Limerick) 
1640–1647 Edward Parry (afterwards Bishop of Killaloe 1647) 
1647 Robert Parry
1661–1663 Richard Underwood
1664–1666 Hugh Gore (afterwards Bishop of Waterford and Lismore 1666) 
1666–1670 Richard Lingard
1670–1678 Michael Ward (afterwards Bishop of Ossory 1678) 
1678–1682 Edward Jones (afterwards Bishop of Cloyne 1682) 
1683–1690 Barzillai Jones
1691–1719 William Jephson
1719–1720 Arthur Price (afterwards Dean of Ferns, 1720)
1720–1723 William Crosse (afterwards Dean of Leighlin, 1723) 
1723–1724 John Francis
1724–1725 William Burscough (appointed Bishop of Limerick, Ardfert and Aghadoe 1725) 
1725–1747 Alexander Alcock  
1747–1762 Washington Cotes
1762–1791 John Ryder
1791–1796 John Whetham
1796–1828 John Scott
1828–1831 John Bayly  
1831–1834 George Bishopp, 9th Baronet
1834–1849 Henry Cotton
1850–1850 Thomas Townsend (afterwards Dean of Waterford 1850 and Bishop of Meath 1850)
1850-1884 Montague Browne
1884-1913 Henry Brougham
1913–1919 George Mayers (afterwards Dean of Waterford, 1919)
1919–1930 William Greene
1930–1934 John Leslie
1934–1961 Charles Stanley
1961–1987 Gilbert Mayes
1988-1990 Bill Bowder
1990–1996 Cecil Weekes
1996–1999 James Healey  
?2003–2008 William Beare
2009–present Paul Draper

References

 
Diocese of Cashel and Ossory
Lismore